Nigel Francis Scarth Rusted,  (July 1, 1907 – March 18, 2012) was a Canadian medical doctor. He is credited with having made outstanding contributions to the medical profession in Newfoundland and Labrador.

The son of Rev. Canon Ernest Rusted and Faith Hollands Rusted, he was born in Salvage, Newfoundland and grew up in Upper Island Cove. Rusted attended high school in St. John's and attended newly established Memorial University College, graduating in 1927. He interned at the tuberculosis sanatorium in Kentville, at the Aberdeen Hospital in New Glasgow and at the Victoria Hospital in Halifax. After graduating in 1933, Rusted accepted a position at the St. John's General Hospital. After suffering a severe throat infection in 1935, he worked on the floating clinic ship MV Lady Anderson for a year. In 1936, he opened a private clinic in St. John's and also became a junior surgeon at the General Hospital. From 1954 to 1968, he served as chief surgeon at the General Hospital. He also served as medical director, chief of staff and chief surgeon at the Grace General Hospital. Over his career, he served as senior consultant at all four hospitals in St. John's of the time: St. John’s General Hospital, St. Clare's Mercy Hospital, Grace General Hospital and Janeway Child Health Centre. Rusted retired from surgery in 1982 at the age of 75 and, in 1987, he retired from clinical practice.

When, due to the efforts of his brother Ian, a medical school was established at Memorial University, he served as clinical professor of surgery at the school in 1968. He had also served on the first board of regents for Memorial University of Newfoundland from 1951 to 1957.

He married Florence Anderson and they had three children.

Rusted died at the Health Sciences Centre in St. John's at the age of 104.

Honours and awards
1950: Fellow of the American College of Physicians and Surgeons
1950: Fellow of the International College of Surgeons
1974: Senior Membership of the Canadian Medical Association
1986: Nigel Rusted Lectureship on the History of Surgery, founded by Discipline of Surgery, Faculty of Medicine, Memorial University of Newfoundland
1996: William B. Spaulding Certificate of Merit for contribution to the history of medicine in Canada, awarded by Associated Medical Services, Toronto
2010: Life Membership of the Newfoundland and Labrador Medical Association

 He was made a Member of the Order of Canada in 2011
 He was  named to the Order of Newfoundland and Labrador in 2007.
 He was given the Canadian Version of the Queen Elizabeth II Diamond Jubilee Medal in 2012.
He was given the Freedom of the City of St. John's in 2008.
He was Awarded the Honorary Degree of Doctor of Science from Memorial University of Newfoundland in 1973.
He was made a fellow of the Royal Society of Canada Allowing Him to use the Post Nominal Letters "FRSC"

References 

1907 births
2012 deaths
Fellows of the Royal Society of Canada
Physicians from Newfoundland and Labrador
Members of the Order of Canada
Dalhousie University alumni
Members of the Order of Newfoundland and Labrador
Canadian centenarians
Men centenarians